Seaside Walk is a 1907 Azerbaijani film directed by Vasili Amaşukeli.

The film was shot on 35mm.

External links

1907 films
Azerbaijani silent films
Azerbaijani black-and-white films
Films of the Russian Empire
Russian silent films